Heinrich Ehmsen (9 August 1886 – 6 May 1964) was a German painter and graphic artist.

Life

Apprenticeship, School of Arts and Crafts 
Born in Kiel, Ehmsen, he was the son of a  master and his wife. He started a four-year apprenticeship as a house painter in 1901.

In 1909, together with Lauweriks, Ehmsen designed a room for the Düsseldorf Exhibition "Christliche Kunst".

Paris, Académie Colarossi and Café du Dôme 
During a stay in Paris from 1910 to 1911, Ehmsen studied at the Académie Colarossi, and at the Le Dôme Café he had contacts with Ernesto de Fiori, Jules Pascin and Alfred Flechtheim.

Munich 
In 1911, Ehmsen moved to Munich, where he was influenced by the painters of the Neue Künstlervereinigung München and the Blauer Reiter. In particular, he maintained contact with Marianne von Werefkin and Alexej von Jawlensky. Jawlensky once characterised the latter: "Yes, Jawlensky is already a human being! – He could be canonised."

World War I 
From 1914 to 1918, Ehmsen was stationed as a soldier in the First World War in France, Romania and Flanders. His impressions from the years 1918 to 1919 during the conflicts and the disintegration of the Bavarian Soviet Republic are reflected in many of his works.

1920s 
In 1919, Ehmsen joined the November Group. In 1920, he applied for a residence permit at the Aliens Office at the Munich Police Headquarters for Werefkin, Jawlensky, Helene Nesnakomoff and Andreas Jawlensky which gave them the opportunity to dissolve their Munich flat.

In the summer of 1921, Jawlensky rented Ehmsen's flat in Munich and from there visited Paul Klee, who was then living in Possenhofen on Lake Starnberg.
After an extended trip in 1928 to Martigues in southern France Ehmsen moved to Berlin in 1929.

1930s 
In 1930, he became a member of the Kampfkomitee der Künstler und Geistesarbeiter in support of the Communist Party of Germany in the Reichstag elections. From 1932 to 1933, he stayed in the USSR, where he had an exhibition in Moscow and his works were bought by museums.

Until his arrest by the Gestapo on 18 October 1933, Ehmsen was an artistic employee at Junkers-Werke. Friedrich Peter Drömmers had arranged the job for him. During his imprisonment in the Columbia concentration camp in Berlin, his works were removed from all German museums. Although eight works were shown in the 1937 exhibition Degenerate Art it came to be admitted to the Reich Chamber of Culture in 1939.

1940s 
From 1940 to 1944 he was a soldier in the Wehrmacht. He was employed in the propaganda department of the German military administration in occupied France during World War II, which received its instructions from the Reich Ministry for Popular Enlightenment and Propaganda and the MBF jointly. Lieutenant Ehmsen, responsible for visual arts, was a "comrade" of Lieutenant Gerhard Heller and organised with him the trip of French writers to the 1941 European Meeting of Poets. He organised a trip of French painters and sculptors to Germany in 1941, among them André Derain and Maurice de Vlaminck. However, the Breker exhibition in Paris was not organised by Ehmsen, but by Karl Epting and the Deutsches Institut.

After the Second World War 
In 1945, Ehmsen – together with Karl Hofer – was one of the co-founders of the Berlin University of the Arts in Berlin-Charlottenburg, of which he was deputy director as well as head of the liberal arts department. Because of a declaration of solidarity for the Paris Congrès mondial des partisans pour la paix (World Peace Movement), he was dismissed in 1949. In 1950, Ehmsen became a full member of the Akademie der Künste der DDR and took over the master class for painting.

Legacy 
His estate is now held by the Academy of Arts, Berlin, and includes seven paintings.

Awards 
 1961: Patriotic Order of Merit in Silver

Work  
 Erschießung, 1919
 Meine Kinder, 1922
 Radierungen zu Gerhart Hauptmann's novel , 1927
 Der Angler von Cassis, 1930
 Erschießung des Matrosen Engelhofer, 1932–1933
 Harlekine des Krieges, 1945

Works in public collections 
 Stadtgalerie Kiel
 Academy of Arts, Berlin

Exhibitions 
 1913: Galerie Der Sturm, Berlin, Erster Deutscher Herbstsalon, Gruppenausstellung
 1913:  Städtisches Museum Essen, Einzelausstellung unter dem Namen Heinz Ehmke.
 1914: Wiener und Münchner Galerien, Holzschnitte
 1920: Galerie Goltz, Munich, Einzelausstellung
 1926: Kunstverein Wiesbaden, Graphic works together with Emil Nolde and Frans Masereel
 1926: Kunsthalle Kiel, Holsteinische Künstler, Gruppenausstellung
 1968: Staatliches Museum Schwerin, Gedächnisausstellung aus dem Nachlaß des Künstlers.

Further reading 
 Knut Nievers (ed.): Kunstwende. Der Kieler Impuls des Expressionismus 1915–1922. Wachholtz, Neumünster 1992, .
 Kurzbiografie zu Ehmsen, Heinrich. In  5th edition. Volume 1. Ch. Links, Berlin 2010, .
 Ulrich Schulte-Wülwer: Heinrich Ehmsen. In the same: Kieler Künstler. Volume 3: In der Weimarer Republik und im Nationalsozialismus 1918-1945, Heide: Boyens 2019 (Sonderveröffentlichungen der Gesellschaft für Kieler Stadtgeschichte; 88), .
 Ehmsen, Heinrich. In Hans Vollmer (ed.): Allgemeines Lexikon der bildenden Künstler des XX. Jahrhunderts. Volume 2: E–J. E. A. Seemann, Leipzig 1955,

References

External links 

 
 Heinrich-Ehmsen-Archiv im Archiv der Academy of Arts, Berlin

20th-century German painters
20th-century German male artists
German printmakers
Recipients of the Patriotic Order of Merit in silver
1886 births
1964 deaths
Artists from Kiel